Junior Ward (born 29 June 1956) is a Guyanese boxer. He competed in the men's flyweight event at the 1984 Summer Olympics.

References

1956 births
Living people
Guyanese male boxers
Olympic boxers of Guyana
Boxers at the 1984 Summer Olympics
Place of birth missing (living people)
Flyweight boxers